David John Hunter is an Australian epidemiologist and a former professor in Harvard University's departments of Epidemiology and Nutrition. Hunter was associate epidemiologist, Channing Laboratory, Brigham And Women's Hospital, where he was involved with the programs in breast cancer, cancer epidemiology, and cancer genetics research teams.  Hunter holds a public health position at University of Oxford, where he leads a collaborative project between Oxford and the Harvard Chan School.

Early life and education
David Hunter was born in London, England and while an infant moved with his family to Sydney, Australia, where he later earned his medical degree (MBBS) in 1982.  He then moved to the United States for graduate study at the Harvard School of Public Health, where he earned both a master's degree (MPH, 1985) and a doctorate (ScD, 1988) in public health.

Career
Hunter was Acting Dean of the Faculty and before that Dean for Academic Affairs at the Harvard T.H. Chan School of Public Health in Boston, and Vincent L. Gregory Professor in Cancer Prevention, Emeritus.

Research

Hunter's principal career research interests are the etiology of various cancers, particularly breast, colorectal, and skin cancers, and prostate cancer in men.  He has been an investigator on the Nurses' Health Study, a long-running cohort of 121,000 U.S. women, and was project director for the Nurses’ Health Study II, a cohort of 116,000 women followed since 1989. His focus is on genetic susceptibility to these cancers, and gene-environment interactions. This work was originally based in subcohorts of the Nurses Health Study and the Health Professionals Follow-up Study of approximately 33,000 women and 18,000 men who have given a blood sample that can be used for DNA analysis.

Cancer Consortia

Until 2012, Hunter was co-chair of the NCI Breast and Prostate Cancer Cohort Consortium and co-director of the NCI Cancer Genetic Markers of Susceptibility (CGEMS) Special Initiative.  They became members of large collaborative consortia in order to obtain the necessarily large sample sizes and to assess consistency of results across studies.

HIV research and global health

In the 1980s and 1990s, he collaborated with investigators in Kenya and Tanzania on early studies of HIV transmission, and subsequently he collaborated on studies of nutritional aspects of AIDS progression as they relate to child survival in affected populations. He currently co-edits a series of articles on global health which are being published in the New England Journal of Medicine, for which he also serves as a statistical consultant.

Publications
 January 26, 2015, Most cancers not just "bad luck"
 NCBI publications for Dr. David Hunter
 Selected Publications (Since 2012) for  David Hunter

References

Harvard School of Public Health faculty
Australian oncologists
People from Boston
Genetic epidemiologists
Living people
Public health researchers
Fellows of Green Templeton College, Oxford
Harvard School of Public Health alumni
Sydney Medical School alumni
Year of birth missing (living people)